Fruitvale station is a Bay Area Rapid Transit (BART) station located in the Fruitvale District of Oakland, California. The elevated station has two side platforms.

History 

Service at the station began on September 11, 1972. The redevelopment of the immediate station area from a parking lot to a mixed-use "transit village" has served as a model for transit-oriented development planning elsewhere in the Bay Area.

On January 1, 2009, a BART police officer fatally shot an unarmed man, Oscar Grant III, at Fruitvale station while responding to reports of a fight on a train. Grant's death sparked several protests in Oakland, and was one of several police killings that contributed to the nationwide Black Lives Matter movement. Fruitvale Station, a film about the killing, was released in 2013.

Tempo bus rapid transit service on International Boulevard began on August 9, 2020.

References

External links 

 BART – Fruitvale

Bay Area Rapid Transit stations in Alameda County, California
Stations on the Orange Line (BART)
Stations on the Green Line (BART)
Stations on the Blue Line (BART)
Railway stations in Oakland, California
Railway stations in the United States opened in 1972
United States bike stations
Bus stations in Alameda County, California